Patricia Highsmith (January 19, 1921 – February 4, 1995) was an American novelist and short story writer widely known for her psychological thrillers, including her series of five novels featuring the character Tom Ripley.

She wrote 22 novels and numerous short stories throughout her career spanning nearly five decades, and her work has led to more than two dozen film adaptations. Her writing derived influence from existentialist literature, and questioned notions of identity and popular morality. She was dubbed "the poet of apprehension" by novelist Graham Greene.

Her first novel, Strangers on a Train, has been adapted for stage and screen, the best known being the 1951 film directed by Alfred Hitchcock. Her 1955 novel The Talented Mr. Ripley has been adapted for film multiple times. Writing under the pseudonym Claire Morgan, Highsmith published the first lesbian novel with a happy ending, The Price of Salt, in 1952, republished 38 years later as Carol under her own name and later adapted into a 2015 film.

Early life
Highsmith was born Mary Patricia Plangman in Fort Worth, Texas. She was the only child of artists Jay Bernard Plangman (1889–1975), who was of German descent, and Mary Plangman (née Coates; September 13, 1895 – March 12, 1991). The couple divorced ten days before their daughter's birth.

In 1927, Highsmith, her mother and her adoptive stepfather, artist Stanley Highsmith, whom her mother had married in 1924, moved to New York City. When she was 12 years old, Highsmith was sent to Fort Worth and lived with her maternal grandmother for a year.  She called this the "saddest year" of her life and felt "abandoned" by her mother. She returned to New York to continue living with her mother and stepfather, primarily in Manhattan, but also in Astoria, Queens.

According to Highsmith, her mother once told her that she had tried to abort her by drinking turpentine, although a biography of Highsmith indicates Jay Plangman tried to persuade his wife to have the abortion but she refused. Highsmith never resolved this love–hate relationship, which reportedly haunted her for the rest of her life, and which she fictionalized in "The Terrapin", her short story about a young boy who stabs his mother to death. Highsmith's mother predeceased her by only four years, dying at the age of 95.

Highsmith's grandmother taught her to read at an early age, and she made good use of her grandmother's extensive library. At the age of nine, she found a resemblance to her own imaginative life in the case histories of The Human Mind by Karl Menninger, a popularizer of Freudian analysis.

Many of Highsmith's 22 novels were set in Greenwich Village, where she lived at 48 Grove Street from 1940 to 1942, before moving to 345 E. 57th Street. In 1942, Highsmith graduated from Barnard College, where she studied English composition, playwriting, and short story prose. After graduating from college, and despite endorsements from "highly placed professionals," she applied without success for a job at publications such as Harper's Bazaar, Vogue, Mademoiselle, Good Housekeeping, Time, Fortune, and The New Yorker.

Based on the recommendation from Truman Capote, Highsmith was accepted by the Yaddo artist's retreat during the summer of 1948, where she worked on her first novel, Strangers on a Train.

Personal life
Highsmith endured cycles of depression, some of them deep, throughout her life. Despite literary success, she wrote in her diary of January 1970: "[I] am now cynical, fairly rich ... lonely, depressed, and totally pessimistic." Over the years, Highsmith had female hormone deficiency, anorexia nervosa, chronic anemia, Buerger's disease, and lung cancer.

According to her biographer, Andrew Wilson, Highsmith's personal life was a "troubled one". She was an alcoholic who, allegedly, never had an intimate relationship that lasted for more than a few years, and she was seen by some of her contemporaries and acquaintances as misanthropic and hostile. Her chronic alcoholism intensified as she grew older.

She famously preferred the company of animals to that of people and stated in a 1991 interview, "I choose to live alone because my imagination functions better when I don't have to speak with people."

Otto Penzler, her U.S. publisher through his Penzler Books imprint, had met Highsmith in 1983, and four years later witnessed some of her theatrics intended to create havoc at dinner tables and shipwreck an evening. He said after her death that "[Highsmith] was a mean, cruel, hard, unlovable, unloving human being ... I could never penetrate how any human being could be that relentlessly ugly. ... But her books? Brilliant."

Other friends, publishers, and acquaintances held different views of Highsmith. Editor Gary Fisketjon, who published her later novels through Knopf, said that "She was very rough, very difficult ... But she was also plainspoken, dryly funny, and great fun to be around." Composer David Diamond met Highsmith in 1943 and described her as being "quite a depressed person—and I think people explain her by pulling out traits like cold and reserved, when in fact it all came from depression." J. G. Ballard said of Highsmith, "The author of Strangers on a Train and The Talented Mr. Ripley was every bit as deviant and quirky as her mischievous heroes, and didn't seem to mind if everyone knew it." Screenwriter Phyllis Nagy, who adapted The Price of Salt into the 2015 film Carol, met Highsmith in 1987 and the two remained friends for the rest of Highsmith's life. Nagy said that Highsmith was "very sweet" and "encouraging" to her as a young writer, as well as "wonderfully funny."

She was considered by some as "a lesbian with a misogynist streak."

Highsmith loved cats, and she bred about three hundred snails in her garden at home in Suffolk, England. Highsmith once attended a London cocktail party with a "gigantic handbag" that "contained a head of lettuce and a hundred snails" which she said were her "companions for the evening."

She loved woodworking tools and made several pieces of furniture. Highsmith worked without stopping. In later life, she became stooped, with an osteoporotic hump. Though the 22 novels and 8 books of short stories she wrote were highly acclaimed, especially outside of the United States, Highsmith preferred her personal life to remain private.

A lifelong diarist, Highsmith left behind eight thousand pages of handwritten notebooks and diaries.

Sexuality
As an adult, Patricia Highsmith's sexual relationships were predominantly with women. She occasionally engaged in sex with men without physical desire for them, and wrote in her diary: "The male face doesn't attract me, isn't beautiful to me." She told writer Marijane Meaker in the late 1950s that she had "tried to like men. I like most men better than I like women, but not in bed." In a 1970 letter to her stepfather Stanley, Highsmith described sexual encounters with men as "steel wool in the face, a sensation of being raped in the wrong place—leading to a sensation of having to have, pretty soon, a boewl movement," stressing, "If these words are unpleasant to read, I can assure you it is a little more unpleasant in bed." Phyllis Nagy described Highsmith as "a lesbian who did not very much enjoy being around other women" and the few sexual dalliances she had had with men occurred just to "see if she could be into men in that way because she so much more preferred their company."

In 1943, Highsmith had an affair with artist Allela Cornell who, despondent over unrequited love from another woman, died by suicide in 1946 by drinking nitric acid.

During her stay at Yaddo, Highsmith met writer Marc Brandel, son of author J. D. Beresford. Even though she told him about her homosexuality, they soon entered into a short-lived relationship. He convinced her to visit him in Provincetown, Massachusetts, where he introduced her to Ann Smith, a painter and designer with a previous métier as a Vogue fashion model, and the two became involved. After Smith left Provincetown, Highsmith felt she was "in prison" with Brandel and told him she was leaving. "[B]ecause of that I have to sleep with him, and only the fact that it is the last night strengthens me to bear it." Highsmith, who had never been sexually exclusive with Brandel, resented having sex with him. Highsmith temporarily broke off the relationship with Brandel and continued to be involved with several women, reuniting with him after the well-received publication of his new novel. Beginning November 30, 1948, and continuing for the next six months, Highsmith underwent psychoanalysis in an effort "to regularize herself sexually" so she could marry Brandel. The analysis was brought to a stop by Highsmith, after which she ended her relationship with him.

After ending her engagement to Marc Brandel, she had an affair with psychoanalyst Kathryn Hamill Cohen, the wife of British publisher Dennis Cohen and founder of Cresset Press, which later published Strangers on a Train.

To help pay for the twice-a-week therapy sessions, Highsmith had taken a sales job during Christmas rush season in the toy section of Bloomingdale's department store. Ironically, it was during this attempt to "cure" her homosexuality that Highsmith was inspired to write her semi-autobiographical novel The Price of Salt, in which two women meet in a department store and begin a passionate affair.

Believing that Brandel's disclosure that she was homosexual, along with the publication of The Price of Salt, would hurt her professionally, Highsmith had an unsuccessful affair with Arthur Koestler in 1950, designed to hide her homosexuality.

In early September 1951, she began an affair with sociologist Ellen Blumenthal Hill, traveling back and forth to Europe to meet with her. When Highsmith and Hill came to New York in early May 1953, their affair ostensibly "in a fragile state", Highsmith began an "impossible" affair with the homosexual German photographer Rolf Tietgens, who had played a "sporadic, intense, and unconsummated role in her emotional life since 1943." She was reportedly attracted to Tietgens on account of his homosexuality, confiding that she felt with him "as if he is another girl, or a singularly innocent man." Tietgens shot several nude photographs of Highsmith, but only one has survived, torn in half at the waist so that only her upper body is visible. She dedicated The Two Faces of January (1964) to Tietgens.

Between 1959 and 1961, Highsmith was in love with author Marijane Meaker. Meaker wrote lesbian stories under the pseudonym "Ann Aldrich" and mystery/suspense fiction as "Vin Packer", and later wrote young adult fiction as "M. E. Kerr." In the late 1980s, after 27 years of separation, Highsmith began corresponding with Meaker again, and one day showed up on Meaker's doorstep, slightly drunk and ranting bitterly. Meaker later said she was horrified at how Highsmith's personality had changed.

Highsmith was attracted to women of privilege who expected their lovers to treat them with veneration. According to Phyllis Nagy, she belonged to a "very particular subset of lesbians" and described her conduct with many women she was interested in as being comparable to a movie "studio boss" who chased starlets. Many of these women, who to some extent belonged to the 'Carol Aird'-type and her social set, remained friendly with Highsmith and confirmed the stories of seduction.

An intensely private person, Highsmith was remarkably open and outspoken about her sexuality. She told Meaker: "the only difference between us and heterosexuals is what we do in bed."

Death
Highsmith died on February 4, 1995, at 74, from a combination of aplastic anemia and lung cancer at Carita Hospital in Locarno, Switzerland, near the village where she had lived since 1982. She was cremated at the cemetery in Bellinzona; a memorial service was conducted in the Chiesa di Tegna in Tegna, Ticino, Switzerland; and her ashes were interred in its columbarium.

She left her estate, worth an estimated $3 million, and the promise of any future royalties to the Yaddo colony, where she spent two months in 1948 writing the draft of Strangers on a Train. Highsmith bequeathed her literary estate to the Swiss Literary Archives at the Swiss National Library in Bern, Switzerland. Her Swiss publisher, Diogenes Verlag, was appointed literary executor of the estate.

Religious, racial and ethnic views
Highsmith was a resolute atheist. Although she considered herself a liberal, and in her school years had gotten along with black students, in later years she believed that black people were responsible for the welfare crisis in America. She disliked Koreans because "they ate dogs".

Highsmith was an avowed antisemite; she described herself as a "Jew hater" and described The Holocaust as "the semicaust". When she was living in Switzerland in the 1980s, she used nearly 40 aliases when writing to government bodies and newspapers deploring the state of Israel and the "influence" of the Jews. Highsmith was an active supporter of Palestinian rights, a stance which, according to Carol screenwriter Phyllis Nagy, "often teetered into outright antisemitism."

Politics
Highsmith described herself as a social democrat. She believed in American democratic ideals and in "the promise" of U.S. history, but was also highly critical of the reality of the country's 20th-century culture and foreign policy. Beginning in 1963, she resided exclusively in Europe. She retained her United States citizenship, despite the tax penalties, of which she complained bitterly while living for many years in France and Switzerland.

Palestine
Highsmith aligned herself with writers such as Gore Vidal, Alexander Cockburn, Noam Chomsky and Edward Said in supporting Palestinian self-determination. As a member of Amnesty International, she felt duty-bound to express publicly her opposition to the displacement of Palestinians. Highsmith prohibited her books from being published in Israel after the election of Menachem Begin as prime minister in 1977. She dedicated her 1983 novel People Who Knock on the Door to the Palestinian people: 

The inscription was dropped from the U.S. edition with permission from her agent but without consent from Highsmith. 

Highsmith contributed financially to the Jewish Committee on the Middle East, an organization that represented American Jews who supported Palestinian self-determination. She wrote in an August 1993 letter to Marijane Meaker: "USA could save 11 million per day if they would cut the dough to Israel. The Jewish vote is 1%."

Writing history

Comic books
After graduating from Barnard College, before her short stories started appearing in print, Highsmith wrote for comic book publishers from 1942 and 1948, while she lived in New York City and Mexico. Answering an ad for "reporter/rewrite", she landed a job working for comic book publisher Ned Pines in a "bullpen" with four artists and three other writers. Initially scripting two comic-book stories a day for $55-a-week paychecks, Highsmith soon realized she could make more money by freelance writing for comics, a situation which enabled her to find time to work on her own short stories and live for a period in Mexico. The comic book scriptwriter job was the only long-term job Highsmith ever held.

From 1942 to 1943, for the Sangor–Pines shop (Better/Cinema/Pines/Standard/Nedor), Highsmith wrote "Sergeant Bill King" stories, contributed to Black Terror and Fighting Yank comics, and wrote profiles such as Catherine the Great, Barney Ross, and Capt. Eddie Rickenbacker for the "Real Life Comics" series. From 1943 to 1946, under editor Vincent Fago at Timely Comics, she contributed to its U.S.A. Comics wartime series, writing scenarios for comics such as Jap Buster Johnson and The Destroyer. During these same years she wrote for Fawcett Publications, scripting for Fawcett Comics characters "Crisco and Jasper" and others. Highsmith also wrote for True Comics, Captain Midnight, and Western Comics.

When Highsmith wrote the psychological thriller novel The Talented Mr. Ripley (1955), one of the title character's first victims is a comic-book artist named Reddington: "Tom had a hunch about Reddington. He was a comic-book artist. He probably didn't know whether he was coming or going."

Early novels and short stories
Highsmith's first novel, Strangers on a Train, proved modestly successful upon publication in 1950, and Alfred Hitchcock's 1951 film adaptation of the novel enhanced her reputation.

Highsmith's second novel, The Price of Salt, was published in 1952 under the pen name Claire Morgan.  Highsmith mined her personal life for the novel's content.  Its groundbreaking happy ending and departure from stereotypical conceptions about lesbians made it stand out in lesbian fiction.  In what BBC 2's The Late Show presenter Sarah Dunant described as a "literary coming out" after 38 years of disaffirmation, Highsmith finally acknowledged authorship of the novel publicly when she agreed to the 1990 publication by Bloomsbury retitled Carol. Highsmith wrote in the "Afterword" to the new edition: 

The paperback version of the novel sold nearly one million copies before its 1990 reissue as Carol. The Price of Salt is distinct for also being the only one of Highsmith's novels in which no violent crime takes place, and where her characters have "more explicit sexual existences" and are allowed "to find happiness in their relationship."

Her short stories appeared for the first time in Ellery Queen's Mystery Magazine in the early 1950s.

Her last novel, Small g: a Summer Idyll, was rejected by Knopf (her usual publisher by then) several months before her death, leaving Highsmith without an American publisher. It was published posthumously in the United Kingdom by Bloomsbury Publishing in March 1995, and nine years later in the United States by W. W. Norton.

The "Ripliad"

In 1955, Highsmith wrote The Talented Mr. Ripley, a novel about Tom Ripley, a charming criminal who murders a rich man and steals his identity. Highsmith wrote four sequels: Ripley Under Ground (1970), Ripley's Game (1974),  The Boy Who Followed Ripley (1980) and Ripley Under Water (1991), about Ripley's exploits as a con artist and serial killer who always gets away with his crimes. The series—collectively called "The Ripliad"—are some of Highsmith's most popular works.

The "suave, agreeable and utterly amoral" Ripley is Highsmith's most famous character, and has been critically acclaimed for being "both a likable character and a cold-blooded killer." He has typically been regarded as "cultivated", a "dapper sociopath", and an "agreeable and urbane psychopath."

Sam Jordison of The Guardian wrote, "It is near impossible, I would say, not to root for Tom Ripley. Not to like him. Not, on some level, to want him to win. Patricia Highsmith does a fine job of ensuring he wheedles his way into our sympathies." Film critic Roger Ebert made a similar appraisal of the character in his review of Purple Noon, René Clément's 1960 film adaptation of The Talented Mr. Ripley: "Ripley is a criminal of intelligence and cunning who gets away with murder. He's charming and literate, and a monster. It's insidious, the way Highsmith seduces us into identifying with him and sharing his selfishness; Ripley believes that getting his own way is worth whatever price anyone else might have to pay. We all have a little of that in us." Novelist Sarah Waters esteemed The Talented Mr. Ripley as the "one book I wish I'd written."

The first three books of the "Ripley" series have been adapted into films five times. In 2015, The Hollywood Reporter announced that a group of production companies were planning a television series based on the novels. The series is currently in development.

Honors
 1979 : Grand Master, Swedish Crime Writers' Academy
 1987 : , Festival du Cinéma Américain de Deauville
 1989 : Chevalier dans l'Ordre des Arts et des Lettres, French Ministry of Culture
 1993 : Best Foreign Literary Award, Finnish Crime Society
 2008 : Greatest Crime Writer, The Times

Awards and nominations
 1946 : O. Henry Award, Best First Story, for The Heroine (in Harper's Bazaar)
 1951 : Nominee, Edgar Allan Poe Award, Best First Novel, Mystery Writers of America, for Strangers on a Train
 1956 : Edgar Allan Poe Scroll (special award), Mystery Writers of America, for The Talented Mr. Ripley
 1957 : Grand Prix de Littérature Policière, International, for The Talented Mr. Ripley
 1963 : Nominee, Edgar Allan Poe Award, Best Short Story, Mystery Writers of America, for The Terrapin  (in Ellery Queen's Mystery Magazine)
 1963 :  Special Award, Mystery Writers of America, for The Terrapin
 1964 : Silver Dagger Award, Best Foreign Novel, Crime Writers' Association, for The Two Faces of January (pub. Heinemann)
 1975 :  for L'Amateur d'escargots (pub. Calmann-Lévy) (English title: Eleven)

Bibliography

Novels
 Strangers on a Train (1950)
 The Price of Salt (1952) (as Claire Morgan) (republished as Carol in 1990 under Highsmith's name)
 The Blunderer (1954)
 Deep Water (1957)
 A Game for the Living (1958)
 This Sweet Sickness (1960)
 The Cry of the Owl (1962)
 The Two Faces of January (1964)
 The Glass Cell (1964)
 A Suspension of Mercy (1965) (published as The Story-Teller in the U.S.)
 Those Who Walk Away (1967)
 The Tremor of Forgery (1969)
 A Dog's Ransom (1972)
 Edith's Diary (1977)
 People Who Knock on the Door (1983)
 Found in the Street (1986)
 Small g: a Summer Idyll (1995)
The "Ripliad"
 The Talented Mr. Ripley (1955)
 Ripley Under Ground (1970)
 Ripley's Game (1974)
 The Boy Who Followed Ripley (1980)
 Ripley Under Water (1991)

Film, television, theatre and radio adaptations

Several of Highsmith's works have been adapted for other media, some more than once. In 1978, Highsmith was president of the jury at the 28th Berlin International Film Festival.

Film

 1951. Strangers on a Train was adapted as a film of same name directed by Alfred Hitchcock starring Farley Granger as Guy Haines, Robert Walker as Anthony Bruno, Ruth Roman as Anne Morton, Patricia Hitchcock as Barbara Morton and Laura Elliott as Miriam Joyce Haines.
 1963. The Blunderer was adapted as French language film Le meurtrier ("The Murderer"), directed by Claude Autant-Lara starring Maurice Ronet as Walter Saccard, Yvonne Furneaux as Clara Saccard, Gert Fröbe as Melchior Kimmel, Marina Vlady as Ellie and Robert Hossein as Corbi. It is known in English as Enough Rope.
 1969. Strangers on a Train was adapted as Once You Kiss a Stranger, directed by Robert Sparr starring Paul Burke as Jerry, Carol Lynley as Diana and Martha Hyer as Lee.
 1977. This Sweet Sickness was adapted as French language film Dites-lui que je l'aime, directed by Claude Miller starring Gérard Depardieu as David Martineau, Miou-Miou as Juliette, Dominique Laffin as Lise, and Jacques Denis as Gérard Dutilleux. It is known in English as This Sweet Sickness.
 1978. The Glass Cell was adapted as German language film Die gläserne Zelle, directed by Hans W. Geißendörfer starring Brigitte Fossey as Lisa Braun, Helmut Griem as Phillip Braun, Dieter Laser as David Reinelt and Walter Kohut as Robert Lasky.
 1981. Deep Water was adapted as French language film Eaux profondes, directed by Michel Deville starring Isabelle Huppert as Melanie and Jean-Louis Trintignant as Vic Allen.
 1983. Edith's Diary was adapted as German language film Ediths Tagebuch, directed by Hans W. Geißendörfer starring Angela Winkler as Edith.
 1986. The Two Faces of January was adapted as German language film Die zwei Gesichter des Januars, directed by Wolfgang Storch starring Charles Brauer as Chester McFarland, Yolanda Jilot as Colette McFarland and Thomas Schücke as Rydal Keener.
 1987. The Cry of the Owl was adapted as French language film Le cri du hibou, directed by Claude Chabrol starring Christophe Malavoy as Robert, Mathilda May as Juliette, Jacques Penot as Patrick and Virginie Thévenet as Véronique.
 1987. The film version of Strangers on a Train by Alfred Hitchcock inspired the black comedy American film Throw Momma from the Train, directed by Danny DeVito.
 1989. A Suspension of Mercy (aka The Story Teller)  was adapted as German language film Der Geschichtenerzähler, directed by Rainer Boldt starring Udo Schenk as Nico Thomkins and Anke Sevenich as Helen Thomkins.
 2009. The Cry of the Owl was adapted as a film of same name, directed by Jamie Thraves starring Paddy Considine as Robert Forester and Julia Stiles as Jenny Thierolf.
 2014. The Two Faces of January was adapted as a film of same name, written and directed by Hossein Amini starring Viggo Mortensen as Chester MacFarland, Kirsten Dunst as Colette MacFarland and Oscar Isaac as Rydal. It was released during the 64th Berlin International Film Festival. 
 2014. A Mighty Nice Man was adapted as a short film, directed by Jonathan Dee starring Kylie McVey as Charlotte, Jacqueline Baum as Emilie, Kristen Connolly as Charlotte's Mother, and Billy Magnussen as Robbie.
 2015. A film adaption of The Price of Salt, titled Carol, was written by Phyllis Nagy and directed by Todd Haynes, starring Cate Blanchett as Carol Aird and Rooney Mara as Therese Belivet.
 2016. The Blunderer was adapted as A Kind of Murder, directed by Andy Goddard starring Patrick Wilson as Walter Stackhouse, Jessica Biel as Clara Stackhouse, Eddie Marsan as Marty Kimmel and Haley Bennett as Ellie Briess.
 2022. Deep Water was adapted again, directed by Adrian Lyne starring Ben Affleck and Ana de Armas.

"Ripliad"
 1960: The Talented Mr. Ripley was adapted as French language film Plein soleil (titled Purple Noon for English-language audiences, though it translates as "Full Sun"). Directed by René Clément starring Alain Delon as Tom Ripley, Maurice Ronet as Philippe Greenleaf, and Marie Laforêt as Marge Duval. Both Highsmith and film critic Roger Ebert criticized the screenplay for altering the ending to prevent Ripley from going unpunished as he does in the novel.
 1977:  Ripley's Game (third novel) and a "plot fragment" of Ripley Under Ground (second novel) were adapted as German language film Der Amerikanische Freund (The American Friend). Directed by Wim Wenders with Dennis Hopper as Ripley. Highsmith initially disliked the film but later found it stylish, although she did not like how Ripley was interpreted.
 1999: The Talented Mr. Ripley was adapted as an American production. Directed by Anthony Minghella with Matt Damon as Ripley, Jude Law as Dickie Greenleaf, and Gwyneth Paltrow as Marge Sherwood.
 2002: Ripley's Game was adapted as a film of same name for an English language Italian production. Directed by Liliana Cavani with John Malkovich as Ripley, Chiara Caselli as Luisa Harari Ripley, Ray Winstone as Reeves Minot, Dougray Scott as Jonathan Trevanny, and Lena Headey as Sarah Trevanny. Although not all reviews were favorable, Roger Ebert regarded it as the best of all the Ripley films.
 2005: Ripley Under Ground was adapted as a film of same name. Directed by Roger Spottiswoode with Barry Pepper as Ripley, Jacinda Barrett as Héloïse Plisson-Ripley, Willem Dafoe as Neil Murchison, and Tom Wilkinson as John Webster.
 2020: Ripley upcoming American television series by Showtime. Directed by Steven Zaillian  starring Andrew Scott as Tom Ripley.

Television

 1958. Strangers on a Train was adapted by Warner Brothers for an episode of the TV series 77 Sunset Strip.
 1982. Scenes from the Ripley novels were dramatized in the episode A Gift for Murder of The South Bank Show, with Jonathan Kent portraying Tom Ripley. The episode included an interview with Patricia Highsmith.
 1983. Deep Water was adapted as a two-part miniseries for German television as Tiefe Wasser, directed by Franz Peter Wirth starring Peter Bongartz as Vic van Allen, Constanze Engelbrecht as Melinda van Allen, Reinhard Glemnitz  as Dirk Weisberg, Raimund Harmstorf as Anton Kameter, and Sky du Mont as Charley de Lisle.
 1987. The Cry of the Owl was adapted for German television as Der Schrei der Eule, directed by Tom Toelle starring Matthias Habich as Robert Forster, Birgit Doll as Johanna Tierolf, Jacques Breuer as Karl Weick, Fritz Lichtenhahn as Inspektor Lippenholtz, and Doris Kunstmann as Vicky.
 1990. The twelve episodes of the television series Mistress of Suspense are based on stories by Highsmith. The series aired first in France, then in the UK. It became available in the U.S. under the title Chillers.
 1993. The Tremor of Forgery was adapted as German television film Trip nach Tunis, directed by Peter Goedel starring David Hunt as Howard Ingham, Karen Sillas as Ina Pallant and John Seitz as Francis J. Adams.
 1995. Little Tales of Misogyny was adapted as Spanish/Catalan television film Petits contes misògins, directed by Pere Sagristà starring Marta Pérez, Carme Pla, Mamen Duch, and Míriam Iscla.
 1996. Strangers on a Train was adapted for television as Once You Meet a Stranger, directed by Tommy Lee Wallace starring Jacqueline Bisset as Sheila Gaines ("Guy"), Theresa Russell as Margo Anthony ("Bruno") and Celeste Holm as Clara. The gender of the two lead characters was changed from male to female.
 1996. A Dog's Ransom was adapted as French television film La rançon du chien, directed by Peter Kassovitz starring François Négret as César, François Perrot as Edouard Raynaud, Daniel Prévost as Max Ducasse and Charlotte Valandrey as Sophie.

Theatre
 1998. The Talented Mr. Ripley was adapted for the stage as a play of same name by playwright Phyllis Nagy. It was revived in 2010.
 2013. Strangers on a Train was adapted as a play of same name by playwright Craig Warner.

Radio
 2002. A four-episode radio drama of The Cry of the Owl was broadcast by BBC Radio 4, with voice acting by John Sharian as Robert Forester, Joanne McQuinn as Jenny Theirolf, Adrian Lester as Greg Wyncoop, and Matt Rippy as Jack Neilsen.
 2009. All five books of the "Ripliad" were dramatized by BBC Radio 4, with Ian Hart voicing Tom Ripley.
 2014. A five-segment dramatization of Carol (aka The Price of Salt) was broadcast by BBC Radio 4, with voice acting by Miranda Richardson as Carol Aird and Andrea Deck as Therese Belivet.
 2019. A five-episode broadcast of selected short stories (One for the Islands, A Curious Suicide, The Terrors of Basket-Weaving, The Man Who Wrote Books In His Head, The Baby Spoon) by BBC Radio 4.

Novels, films and plays about Highsmith
Novels
 

Films
  Highsmith: Her Secret Life (2004), made for television documentary by Hugh Thomson, BBC Four.
  Highsmith: Her Secret Life, "notes on the film", Hugh Thomson, BBC, 2004.
 Loving Highsmith (2022), theatrical documentary by Eva Vitija, Ensemble Film GmbH.

Plays
 Murray-Smith, Joanna (2015). Switzerland. Dramatists Play Service. . (First presented at Sydney Theatre Company in November 2014).

Graphic Novels

See also
Ruth Rendell: A "mistress of suspense" contemporary of Highsmith for whom Highsmith acknowledged rarely admitted admiration. Rendell explored characters and themes similar to Highsmith's.

Notes

References

Further reading

 Dirda, Michael (July 2, 2009). This Woman Is Dangerous. The New York Review of Books. Retrieved October 6, 2015.
 Dupont, Joan (June 12, 1988). Criminal Pursuits. The New York Times. Retrieved March 28, 2017. 
 Helmore, Edward (October 26, 2019). Diaries expose ‘strong brew’ of Ripley novelist Patricia Highsmith's dark thoughts. The Guardian. Retrieved November 21, 2019.
 McCann, Sean (April 1, 2011).  “Frequently as a rat has orgasms”.  New York City in the '40s, Wesleyan University. Retrieved December 29, 2015.
 Morgan, Kim (December 4, 2015). The Gnarly Allure of Patricia Highsmith. The Daily Beast. Retrieved March 5, 2016.
 Perrin, Tom (December 18, 2012).  On Patricia Highsmith. Post45 (Yale University). Retrieved March 12, 2016.
 Piepenbring, Dan (January 19, 2015).  A Dissatisfaction with Life. The Paris Review. Retrieved March 5, 2016.
 Rayner, Richard (July 17, 2011). Paperback Writers: Classic Patricia Highsmith. Los Angeles Times. Retrieved March 18, 2016.
 Schenkar, Joan (January 21, 2012). The Talented Miss Highsmith: The Secret Life and Serious Art of Patricia Highsmith. Joan Schenkar. Retrieved March 5, 2016.
 Schenkar, Joan (February 25, 2016). What Patricia Highsmith did for love: 'The Price of Salt' and the secrets behind 'Carol'. Los Angeles Times. Retrieved March 5, 2016.
 Shipley, Diane (April 1, 2014). Patricia Highsmith's criminal neglect. The Guardian. Retrieved March 5, 2016.
 
 Smith, Nathan (November 19, 2015). When Patricia Highsmith Offered Gay Readers a Hopeful Ending. The New Republic. Retrieved March 5, 2016.
 Tonkin, Boyd (December 7, 2015).  'Carol', Patricia Highsmith, and how gay literature found its voice in the 1950s. The Independent. Retrieved March 5, 2016.

Books

External links

 Patricia Highsmith Papers – Swiss Literary Archives. Swiss National Library, 2006.
 Patricia Highsmith – Exhibition of the Swiss National Library. March–September 2006, Swiss National Library, March 13, 2006.
 Patricia Highsmith : photographs from the exhibition. Swiss Literary Archives, Swiss National Library, December 1, 2006. (archive)
 Choose Your Highsmith (The Patricia Highsmith Recommendation Engine). W. W. Norton & Company. 
 Patricia Highsmith First Edition Book Cover Gallery (UK publishers). Existential Ennui, 2013.
 Patricia Highsmith gallery by René Burri, Magnum Photos, 1988.
  Patricia Highsmith interview by Naim Attallah, Naim Attallah Online, Quartet Books, 1993.
  Works by or about Patricia Highsmith in libraries (WorldCat catalog)

Audio interviews
 Patricia Highsmith on Audio Interviews: "Thrillers and Crime Fiction", BBC Four, December 3, 1972 (archive)
 Patricia Highsmith interview with Roy Plomley, Desert Island Discs, BBC Radio 4, April 21, 1979.
 Patricia Highsmith interview (The Black House) with Peter Clayton, Meridian, BBC World Service, August 8, 1980.
 Patricia Highsmith interview with Terry Gross, Fresh Air, NPR, October 27, 1987.
 Patricia Highsmith interview with Don Swaim, Book Beat, WCBS-Radio (via Wired for Books, Ohio University), October 29, 1987. (archive) 
  Patricia Highsmith, In Conversation with Michael Dibdin, ICA talks, Institute of Contemporary Arts, September 27, 1991.

1921 births
1995 deaths
20th-century American novelists
20th-century American short story writers
20th-century American women writers
20th-century pseudonymous writers
American adoptees
American comics writers
American crime fiction writers
American detective fiction writers
American horror writers
American lesbian writers
American people of German descent
American women novelists
American women short story writers
Female comics writers
LGBT comics creators
American LGBT novelists
People with mood disorders
Pseudonymous women writers
American psychological fiction writers
Women horror writers
Women mystery writers
Deaths from anemia
Deaths from cancer in Switzerland
LGBT people from Texas
People from Fort Worth, Texas
People from Greenwich Village
Golden Age comics creators
Members of the Detection Club
Officiers of the Ordre des Arts et des Lettres
Barnard College alumni
Yaddo alumni
The New Yorker people